The discography of David Gray, a British singer-songwriter, consists of twelve studio albums, a live album, three compilation albums, an EP, and twenty-one singles.

Gray released three studio albums in the 1990s before finally making a commercial breakthrough with his fourth album White Ladder (1998), which received little attention at first before being re-released the following year. It has sold over 3 million copies in the UK alone, making it one of the best-selling albums of all time there.

Gray achieved two subsequent number-one albums with A New Day at Midnight (2002) and Life in Slow Motion (2005).

Albums

Studio albums

Live albums

Compilation albums

Extended plays

Singles

Video albums

Music videos

References

External links
David Gray at Discogs.com
David Gray on the Music Video Database

Rock music discographies
Discographies of British artists
Folk music discographies
Discography